Johannes Ó Corcráin, OSB (sometimes Anglicised as John O'Corcoran) was a bishop in Ireland during the 14th century. Appointed by Pope Gregory XI in 1373, he held the See until 1389.

References

14th-century Roman Catholic bishops in Ireland
Pre-Reformation bishops of Clogher
Irish Benedictines
1389 deaths